Awards and decorations of the National Guard are presented to members of the National Guard (United States) and sometimes to members of the state defense forces in addition to regular United States military decorations. Each of the state governments of the United States maintains a series of military decorations for issuance to members of the National Guard, with such awards presented under the authority of the various state adjutants general.

Active or reserve federal forces veterans who subsequently serve in the National Guard wear all federal awards first, then state awards. Those National Guard soldiers and airmen who subsequently serve in the active or reserve federal forces of the United States Army, Navy, Marine Corps, Coast Guard, or United States Air Force (i.e., as active duty or reserve members of the Army, Navy, Air Force, Marine Corps, or Coast Guard) may not continue to wear and display such decorations on a military uniform, unless such activation is under Title 32 status. Active duty regulations allow federal soldiers, airmen, sailors and Marines to accept but not to wear state awards.

Most states authorize the wear of other states' awards if a soldier or airman has earned awards from a state or territory to which he or she is not presently assigned. The order of precedence is typically the presently assigned state, followed by awards from the District of Columbia, then other states by their order of admission.

The following is a list of National Guard decorations, as issued by each of the fifty United States; Puerto Rico, Guam, the U.S. Virgin Islands, and the District of Columbia.

Alabama 
Alabama National Guard State Awards:

  Alabama Distinguished Service Medal
  Alabama Commendation Medal
  Alabama Phenix City Civil Disturbance Medal
  Alabama Operation Desert Storm Ribbon
  Alabama Veterans Service Medal
  Alabama National Emergency Service Medal
  Alabama Special Service Medal
  Alabama Faithful Service Medal
  Alabama Recruiting Ribbon
  Alabama Active Duty Basic Training Medal

Alaska 
Alaska National Guard State Awards:

  Alaska Decoration of Honor 
  Alaska Heroism Medal 
  Alaska Distinguished Service Medal
  Alaska Legion of Merit
  Alaska Meritorious Service Medal 
  Alaska Air Medal
  Alaska Commendation Medal
  Alaska Achievement Medal 
  Alaska Humanitarian Service Medal
  Alaska State Service Medal
  Alaska Community Service Medal
  Alaska Domestic Emergency Ribbon
   Alaska Marksmanship Medal
  Alaska Homeland Security Medal
  Alaska Recruiting Ribbon
  Alaska State Partnership Program Ribbon 
   Alaska Cold War Victory Ribbon
  Alaska Territorial Guard Medal 
  Alaska Governor's Distinguished Unit Citation 
  Adjutant General's Marksmanship Proficiency Award (Badge)
  Governor's Twenty Award (Tab)

Arizona 
Arizona National Guard State Awards:

  Arizona Medal of Valor
  Arizona Adjutant General's Medal
  Arizona Distinguished Service Medal
  Arizona Meritorious Service Medal
  Arizona Exceptionally Long Service Medal
  Arizona Long Service Medal
  Arizona Service Ribbon
  Arizona Military Academy Ribbon (OCS) 
  Arizona Military Academy Ribbon (NCO)  (No longer awarded)
  Arizona Southwest Asia Service Support Ribbon
  Arizona State Active Duty Service Ribbon
  Arizona Re-enlistment Ribbon  
  Arizona Community Service Ribbon
  Arizona Initial Active Duty for Training Ribbon  (No longer awarded)
  Arizona Recruiting Ribbon
  Arizona Honor Attendance Ribbon  (No Longer Awarded)

Arkansas 
Arkansas National Guard State Awards:
  Arkansas Medal of Honor
  Arkansas Military Medal
  Arkansas Distinguished Service Medal
  Arkansas Exceptional Service Medal
  Arkansas Commendation Medal
  Arkansas Federal Service Ribbon
  Arkansas Service Ribbon
  Arkansas Emergency Service Ribbon
  Arkansas Homeland Defense Ribbon
  Arkansas Recruiting Ribbon
 Arkansas Military Funeral Honors Service Ribbon (Picture Unavailable)

California 
California National Guard State Awards:

  California Medal of Valor
  California Military Cross
  Order of California
  CA Legion of Merit.
  California Medal of Merit
  California Commendation Medal
  CA Achievement Medal
  California Good Conduct Medal
  California Service Medal
  California Enlisted Trainers Excellence Ribbon
  California Enlisted Excellence Ribbon
  California Recruiting Achievement Ribbon
  California National Guard Federal Service Ribbon
  California State Service Ribbon
  California Senior Enlisted Leadership Ribbon
  California Counterdrug Service Ribbon
  California Drill Attendance Ribbon
  California Memorial Medal
  California Governor's Outstanding Unit Citation
  California Commanding General's Meritorious Unit Citation

Colorado 
Colorado National Guard State Awards:

  Colorado Meritorious Conduct Medal
  Colorado Meritorious Service Medal
  Colorado Soldier/Airman of the Year Award
  Colorado Commendation Ribbon
  Colorado Achievement Ribbon
  Colorado NCO Command Tour Ribbon
  Colorado Active Service Medal
  Colorado Long Service Medal
  Colorado TAG Outstanding Unit Citation
  Colorado State Emergency Service Ribbon
  Colorado State Foreign Deployment Service Ribbon
  Colorado State Mobilization Support Ribbon
  Colorado Recruiting Ribbon

Connecticut 
Connecticut National Guard State Awards:
  Connecticut Medal of Valor - "The Adjutant General and two officers of field grade or above, detailed by the Adjutant General, shall act as a board to receive recommendations through military channels for the award of the medal of valor to any member of the armed forces of the state who, by reason of conspicuous gallantry, at the risk of his life, above and beyond the call of duty, while on military service, is recommended for the award of such medal of valor, and to make such awards as the board finds suitable."
  Connecticut Medal of Merit - "The Adjutant General and two officers of field grade or above, appointed by the Adjutant General, shall constitute a board of officers to receive recommendations, through military channels, for the award of the medal of merit to any member of the armed forces of the state who has distinguished himself by exceptionally meritorious conduct in performing outstanding service while a member of the armed forces of the state and to make such awards as the board finds suitable."
 Connecticut Medal of Achievement - "The Adjutant General and two officers of field grade or above, appointed by the Adjutant General, shall constitute a board of officers to receive recommendations, through military channels, for the award, within available appropriations, of the medal of achievement to any member of the armed forces of the state, as defined in section 27-2, the armed forces of the United States or the armed forces of any other state, who has distinguished himself or herself through outstanding achievement or meritorious service during the performance of any state military service. A bronze oak leaf cluster shall be issued in lieu of succeeding awards and a silver oak leaf cluster shall be worn in lieu of five bronze oak leaf clusters."
 Connecticut Veteran Wartime Service Medal  - "The Commissioner of Veterans Affairs in conjunction with the Adjutant General shall award a ribbon and medal to each veteran who served in time of war, as defined in subsection (a) of section 27-103, and who either (1) was a resident of this state at the time he or she was called to active duty for such service, or (2) is domiciled in this state on the date of such award. The commissioner in conjunction with the Adjutant General shall adopt regulations, in accordance with chapter 54, setting forth the process for designing the ribbon and medal, identifying veterans who are eligible for the ribbon and medal under this section and establishing procedures for distributing the ribbon and medal to each eligible veteran. The cost of the ribbons and medals shall be paid from the funds appropriated to the military assistance account within the Military Department. Within existing budgetary resources, awards under this section may be made posthumously for veterans who died on or after November 12, 1918."
  Connecticut Long Service Medal - "The Adjutant General, upon receipt of an application, shall present the long service medal adopted by this state to each soldier or sailor who has completed ten years' faithful service in the armed forces of the state and for each additional five years' service therein the adopted clasp in exchange. In the determination of length of service, the term of service of any member of the armed forces of the state with the military or naval forces of the United States in time of war since April 21, 1898, upon proof of honorable discharge from the same, may be added to the number of years served with the armed forces of the state."
  Connecticut Mobilization Service Ribbon (Formerly the Connecticut Desert Storm Campaign Ribbon) - "The Adjutant General may issue an appropriate service ribbon to members of the National Guard or organized militia who were called to active service in the armed forces of the state or United States for at least thirty consecutive days in support of any military operation commencing after September 11, 2001, during a time of war, as defined in section 27-103. A bronze service star shall be issued in lieu of succeeding awards and a silver service star shall be worn in lieu of five bronze stars. The ribbon may be awarded posthumously."
  Connecticut Emergency Service Ribbon - "The Adjutant General, at his or her discretion, may issue an appropriate service ribbon to all members of the armed forces of the state ordered to active duty in time of emergency for upholding the law and preserving order, protecting lives and property, assisting civil authorities, providing aid and relief to civilians in disaster or similar service ordered by the Governor. A bronze oak leaf cluster shall be issued in lieu of succeeding awards and a silver oak leaf cluster shall be worn in lieu of five bronze oak leaf clusters."
  Connecticut Selected Reserve Force Medal - "The Adjutant General may issue the selected reserve force ribbon to members of the armed forces of the state who have served honorably in a selected reserve force unit designated by the United States Army for a period of at least one year from October 1, 1965, to September 3, 1969, inclusive. The award may be issued to current, retired or separated members of the armed forces of the state, and may be awarded posthumously."
  Connecticut Outstanding Unit Award - "The Adjutant General shall issue an appropriate service ribbon to all members of the unit declared to be the outstanding company-size unit in the Connecticut National Guard in accordance with National Guard regulations, provided such members participated in at least fifty per cent of the unit's training activities during the period covered by the award. A bronze oak leaf cluster shall be issued in lieu of succeeding awards and a silver oak leaf cluster shall be worn in lieu of five bronze oak leaf clusters."
 Connecticut Soldier/Airman/NCO of the Year Ribbon - "The Adjutant General shall issue an achievement ribbon to the soldier, airman and noncommissioned officer of the year in the Connecticut National Guard."
 Connecticut Joint Recruiting Ribbon - "Except as provided in this section, the Adjutant General shall issue a military recruitment ribbon to each member of the armed forces of the state, as defined in section 27-2 of the general statutes, who has assisted in the recruitment of three persons, which persons enlist as new members of the armed forces of the state on or after July 1, 2017, complete basic training and qualify for a military occupational specialty. A bronze oak leaf cluster shall be issued in lieu of succeeding awards and a silver oak leaf cluster shall be worn in lieu of five bronze oak leaf clusters. Any member of the armed forces of the state who is assigned as a military recruiter shall not be eligible for such ribbon during such assignment."

Delaware 
Delaware National Guard State Awards:

  Delaware Conspicuous Service Cross - Awarded for heroism, praiseworthy execution of duties over a period of time, or outstanding achievement which impacts the greater good of the State and its inhabitants.  
  Delaware Distinguished Service Medal - Awarded for praiseworthy execution of duties not to the extent of the DECSC or outstanding achievement of a single or specific act or accomplishment separate and distinct from regularly assigned duties for the greater good of the Delaware National Guard.
  Delaware Medal for Military Merit - Awarded for meritorious service or outstanding achievement over a period of time not to the extent of the DECSC or DEDSM.  Usually based on permanent change of assignment, completed period of service, or retirement.  Awarded for every 10 years of honorable service.  Recognizes a single, specific act or accomplishment separate from regularly assigned duties.  To recognize proficiency in military studies, it is awarded to members who complete a military course of 80 hours or more and who are designated as "honor" or "distinguished honor" graduates.
  Delaware National Guard Medal - Awarded to any member of the DENG who has been called to federal mobilization by the President of the United States.
  Delaware National Defense Service Ribbon - Awarded to all members serving honorably in the DENG during the period 1 AUG 1990 to 31 AUG 1991, dates inclusive and 11 SEP 2001 to a date to be determined.
  Delaware Medal for Service in Aid to Civil Authority - Awarded to any person serving in the DENG who has been called upon by the Governor to assist the civil authorities in the preservation of law and order.
  Delaware Recruiting Ribbon - Awarded to individuals who have excelled in the field of recruiting in the DENG, and for those who are responsible for enlisting or appointing five individuals in the DENG.
  Delaware Physical Fitness Ribbon - Awarded to all DENG members who distinguish themselves by scoring 250-300 points on the Army Physical Fitness Test.
  Delaware National Guard Governor's Meritorious Unit Award - Awarded to those units which distinguish themselves by outstanding achievement above that of other similar units in the DENG.  Unit must report an average assigned strength of over 90% per year, maintain not less than 90% paid drill attendance during the qualifying year, achieve a satisfactory rating on the General Inspection with no unsatisfactory ratings in any sub-areas, and attain the training level objective prescribed for the qualifying year.
  Delaware National Guard Unit Strength Award - Awarded to those units which achieve and maintain 95% strength during the designated year, maintain not less than 80% paid drill attendance, and a re-enlistment rate of 75% for the period.

Subsequent Awards:
Gold Star - The gold star represents subsequent entitlements for the Delaware Conspicuous Service Cross and the Delaware National Guard Medal.  The gold star is 3/16" in diameter and will be affixed to the ribbon of the medal.
Bronze Numerals - The bronze numeral represents subsequent entitlements of the Delaware Distinguished Service Medal, Delaware Medal for Military Merit, Delaware National Defense Service Ribbon, Delaware Medal for Service in Aid to Civil Authority, Delaware Recruiting Ribbon, and the Delaware Physical Fitness Ribbon.  The bronze numeral is 3/16" in diameter and will be affixed to the ribbon of the medal.

District of Columbia 
District of Columbia National Guard District Awards:
  District of Columbia Distinguished Service Medal
  District of Columbia Meritorious Service Medal
  District of Columbia Commendation Medal
  District of Columbia Achievement Medal
  District of Columbia Homeland Defense Medal (ribbon has three red stars in the center.
  District of Columbia NCO Commendation Ribbon
  District of Columbia Enlisted Excellence Ribbon
  District of Columbia Long and Faithful Service Medal (one medal for three years, recognition for five years and additional five-year increments noted with Roman Numerals up to 45 years)
  District of Columbia Emergency Service Ribbon [Note National Guardsmen who responded to protecting the DC Capital Jan-Mar 2021 are eligible to receive one or both of these two ribbons Stars and Stripes March 5,2021]
  District of Columbia Recognition Ribbon
  District of Columbia Special Award Ribbon
  District of Columbia Recruiting and Retention Ribbon (deactivated)
  District of Columbia Community Service Ribbon
  District of Columbia Ceremonial/Drill Team/Color Guard Ribbon
  District of Columbia Active Duty Ribbon (Deactivated)
  District of Columbia Attendance Ribbon
  District of Columbia Commanding General's Outstanding Unit Award
District of Columbia Presidential Inauguration Support Ribbon [Note: National Guardsmen who responded to protecting the DC Capital Jan-Mar 2021 are eligible to receive one or both of these two ribbons Stars and Stripes March 5,2021]

Florida 
Florida National Guard State Awards:

  Florida Cross
  Florida Distinguished Service Medal
  Florida Service Medal
  Florida Commendation Medal
  Florida Meritorious Service Ribbon
  Florida Service Ribbon
  Florida State Active Duty Ribbon
  Florida Recruiting Ribbon
  Florida Retention Ribbon
  Florida Governor's Meritorious Unit Citation
 Florida Counterdrug Ribbon

Georgia 
Georgia National Guard State Awards:

  Georgia Distinctive Service Medal
  Georgia Oglethorpe Distinguished Service Medal
  Georgia Medal for Valor
 Georgia Injury Medal (approved but not issued)
 Georgia Superior Service Medal (approved but not issued)
  Georgia Meritorious Service Medal
 Georgia DoD Commendation Medal (approved but not issued)
  Georgia Commendation Medal 
  Georgia Distinguished Foreign Service Medal 
  Georgia Selected Reserve Force Ribbon
  Georgia Special Operations Ribbon
  Georgia Olympic Ribbon
  Georgia Humanitarian Service Ribbon
  Georgia Service Medal 
  Georgia Active Duty Ribbon
  Georgia Counter Narcotics/Drug Support Service Ribbon
  Georgia Recruiting
  Georgia Distinguished Unit Ribbon

Guam 
  Guam Cross of Valor
  Distinguished Service Medal of Guam
  Guam Commendation Medal
  Organizational Medal
  Faithful Service Medal of Guam
  Recruiting bar
  Counter Drug Service
  Operation Desert Storm Meritorious Service Medal

Hawaii 
Hawaii National Guard State Awards:
  Hawaii Medal of Honor
  Hawaii Medal for Valor
  Hawaii Distinguished Service Order
  Hawaii Medal for Merit
  Hawaii Commendation Medal
  Hawaii Service Medal (type 2)
  Hawaii State Active Duty Ribbon
  Hawaii 1968 Federal Service Ribbon
  Hawaii Active Duty Basic Training Ribbon
  Hawaii Hurricane Iniki Ribbon
  Hawaii Operation Kokua Ribbon
  Hawaii Recruiting Ribbon

Idaho 
Idaho National Guard State Awards:
  Idaho Cross
  Idaho Distinguished Service Medal
 Idaho Meritorious Service Medal
  Idaho Emergency Service Ribbon
  Idaho Army National Guard Recruiting Ribbon
  Idaho Air National Guard Recruiting Ribbon
  Idaho Reenlistment Ribbon
  Idaho State Service Ribbon
  Idaho Basic Training Ribbon
  Idaho Governor's Outstanding Unit Citation
  Idaho Adjutant General's Excellence Award

Illinois 
Awards and decorations of the Illinois National Guard:

  Illinois Military Medal of Valor
  Illinois Military Distinguished Service Medal
  Illinois Military Medal of Merit
  Illinois Military Long and Honorable Service Medal
  Illinois Recruiting Ribbon
  Illinois Military Attendance Ribbon
  Illinois State Active Duty Service Ribbon
  Lincoln Medal Of Freedom
  Illinois First Sergeant Ribbon

Indiana
Indiana National Guard State Awards:
  Indiana Distinguished Service Cross
  Indiana Distinguished Service Medal
  Indiana Commendation Medal
  Indiana Operation Desert Shield/Storm Service Medal
  Indiana Korean Service Medal
  Indiana Homeland Defense Ribbon
  Indiana Emergency Service Ribbon
  Indiana Overseas Service Ribbon
  Indiana OCONUS Service Ribbon
  Indiana Long Service Medal
  Indiana Recruiting Ribbon
  Indiana Retention Ribbon
  Indiana Funeral Honors Ribbon

Iowa 
Iowa National Guard State Awards:
  Iowa Medal of Valor
  Iowa Distinguished Service Medal
  Iowa Medal of Merit
  Iowa Meritorious Service Medal
  Iowa Commendation Medal
  Iowa State Service Ribbon
  Iowa Humanitarian Service Ribbon
  Iowa Leadership Ribbon
  Iowa Active Duty Training Ribbon
  Iowa Recruiting Ribbon
  Iowa Selected Reserve Force Ribbon
  Iowa CFP/FSB Ribbon
  Iowa Outstanding Unit Award

Kansas 
Kansas National Guard State Awards:
  Kansas Medal of Excellence
  Kansas Distinguished Service Medal
  Kansas Governor's Medal
  Kansas Patriot Medal
  Kansas Meritorious Service Medal
  Kansas Commendation Ribbon
  Kansas National Guard Achievement Ribbon
  Kansas Outstanding Guardsman Ribbon (ARNG)
  Kansas Outstanding Guardsman Ribbon (ANG)
  Kansas State Emergency Service Ribbon (ARNG)
  Kansas State Emergency Service Ribbon (ANG)
  Kansas Homeland Defense Ribbon (ARNG) (correct order of precedence)
  Kansas Counter-drug Service Ribbon
  Kansas First Sergeant Ribbon
  Kansas Recruiting Ribbon
  Kansas Service Medal

Kentucky 
Kentucky National Guard Commonwealth Awards:

  Kentucky Medal for Valor
  Kentucky Distinguished Service Medal
  Kentucky Merit Ribbon
  Kentucky Army National Guard Warrant Officer of the Year
  Kentucky Outstanding Airman/Soldier Ribbon
  Kentucky Commendation Ribbon
  Kentucky Berlin Crisis Service Ribbon
  Kentucky National Guard Recruiting Award
  Kentucky Faithful Service Ribbon (20 years)
  Kentucky State Active Duty Ribbon
  Kentucky National Guard ROTC Achievement Medal
  Kentucky National Guard Thirty Year Ribbon
  Kentucky Counterdrug Ribbon

Louisiana 
Louisiana National Guard State Awards:

  Louisiana Medal of Honor
  Louisiana Distinguished Service Cross
  Louisiana Distinguished Service Medal
  Louisiana Legion of Merit
  Louisiana Cross of Merit
  Louisiana Commendation Medal
  Louisiana Achievement Ribbon
  Louisiana Recruiting Ribbon
  Louisiana Retention Ribbon
  Louisiana Distinguished Civilian Service Medal
  Louisiana War Cross
  Louisiana Cold War Victory Medal
  Louisiana Emergency Service Medal
  Louisiana Counterdrug Service Ribbon
  Louisiana General Excellence Medal
  Louisiana Longevity Award
  Louisiana F.E. Herbert Meritorious Unit Commendation (Right Side)

Maine 
Maine National Guard State Awards:
  Maine Distinguished Service Award (Discontinued)
  Maine Meritorious Service Award (Discontinued)
  Maine Commendation Award (Discontinued)
  Maine Adjutant General Award
  Maine Achievement Award
  Maine Commander's Award
  Maine Army National Guard Sergeant Major/NCO/Soldier of the Year Award
  Maine Outstanding Airman of the Year Award
  Maine Recruiting Award
  Maine Physical Fitness Award
  Maine Good Conduct Award (Discontinued)
  Maine Basic Training Award (Discontinued)
  Maine National Emergency Service Award
  Maine State Emergency Service Award (Discontinued)
  Maine Honorable Service Award
  Maine Ice Guard 98 (no longer awarded)

Maryland 
Maryland National Guard State Awards:

  State of Maryland Distinguished Service Cross
  State of Maryland Meritorious Service Medal
  State of Maryland Commendation Medal
  Maryland Outstanding Unit Ribbon
  Maryland National Guard Outstanding Soldier/Airman/First Sergeant of the Year Ribbon
  Maryland National Guard Recruiting Medal
  Maryland National Guard Overseas Service Ribbon
  Maryland National Guard State Service Medal
  Maryland National Guard State Active Duty Medal
  Maryland National Guard Meritorious Civilian Service Medal
  Adjutant General's Special Recognition Ribbon
Obsolete
  Maryland Medal for Valor
  Maryland Air National Guard First Sergeant Ribbon
  Maryland National Guard Counterdrug Ribbon
  Maryland World War I Service Medal
  Maryland Selected Reserve Force Medal

Massachusetts 
Massachusetts National Guard Commonwealth Awards:
  Massachusetts Medal of Liberty
  Massachusetts Medal of Valor
  Massachusetts Military Medal
  Massachusetts Medal of Merit
 Massachusetts Achievement Medal
  Massachusetts Humanitarian Service Medal
  Massachusetts ARNG Service Medal
  Massachusetts ANG Service Medal
  Massachusetts Desert Storm Service Ribbon
  Massachusetts Defense Expeditionary Ribbon
  Massachusetts Defense Service Ribbon
  Massachusetts Emergency Service Ribbon
  Massachusetts Meritorious Unit Citation

Michigan 
Michigan National Guard State Awards:

  Michigan Medal for Valor
  Michigan Distinguished Service Medal
  Michigan Lifesaving Medal
  Michigan Legion of Merit
  Michigan Recruiting Ribbon
 Michigan Honor Guard Ribbon
  Michigan Broadsword Service Medal
  Michigan Active State Service Ribbon
  Michigan State War on Terrorism Ribbon
 Michigan Outside U.S. Service Ribbon
- Michigan Outside U.S. Training Ribbon
  Michigan State Partnership Ribbon

Minnesota 
Minnesota National Guard State Awards:

  Minnesota Distinguished Service Medal
  Minnesota Medal for Valor
  Minnesota Medal for Merit
  Minnesota Commendation Medal
 Minnesota Achievement Ribbon
  Minnesota Good Conduct Ribbon
  Minnesota State Active Duty Ribbon
  Minnesota Distinguished Recruiting Ribbon
  Minnesota Service Ribbon

Mississippi 
Mississippi National Guard State Awards

  Mississippi Medal of Honor
  Mississippi Magnolia Cross - Awarded to any member or former member of the Mississippi National Guard who has distinguished themselves by exceptionally meritorious service in a duty of great responsibility, or by unselfish and untiring activities while in state service or in support of the Mississippi National Guard, has rendered a distinct service in furthering the security and welfare of the state.
  Mississippi Magnolia Medal - Awarded to any member or former member of the Mississippi National Guard, or any of the armed services of the United States, who distinguishes themselves through outstanding service or extraordinary achievement in behalf of the Mississippi National Guard.
  Mississippi Commendation Medal -  May be awarded to any member or former member of the Mississippi National Guard for meritorious service or meritorious achievement on behalf of the state of Mississippi.
  Mississippi Medal of Efficiency - Awarded to enlisted members of the active Mississippi National Guard who have over five (5) years honorable service in the active Mississippi National Guard and have exhibited exemplary behavior, efficiency and loyalty to their unit and the Mississippi National Guard.
  Mississippi War Medal -Awarded to any member of the Mississippi National Guard for honorable service in the Armed Forces of the U.S. during National Emergency declared by the Congress.
  Mississippi Emergency Service Medal - Awarded to any member of the Mississippi National Guard for honoraqble service to the State of Mississippi for duty performed during a major tour of state emergency duty declared by the Adjutant General.
  Mississippi Service School Medal - Awarded to any member of the Mississippi National Guard upon successful completion of any Service School conducted by the active military services while a member of the active Mississippi National Guard not serving in active federal service.
  Mississippi Longevity Medal - Awarded to any member of the Mississippi National Guard for each of a combination of four (4) years of honorable service in the active National Guard of Mississippi.
  Mississippi Recruiting Medal - Awarded to any member of the Mississippi National Guard who obtains three new members for any unit of the organized militia.
  Mississippi Soldier of the Year Ribbon - First issued in 2012, unknown in order of precedence.

Missouri 
Missouri National Guard State Awards:

  Missouri Meritorious Service Medal
  Missouri Conspicuous Service Medal
  Missouri Commendation Ribbon
  Missouri Desert Storm Ribbon
  Missouri 20 Year Long Service Ribbon
  Missouri 15 Year Long Service Ribbon
  Missouri 10 Year Long Service Ribbon
  Missouri 5 Year Long Service Ribbon
  Missouri First Sergeant Ribbon
  Missouri Expeditionary Ribbon
  Missouri State Emergency Duty Ribbon
  Missouri Panamanian Service Ribbon
  Missouri Afghanistan Campaign Ribbon
  Missouri Kosovo Campaign Ribbon
  Missouri Recruiting and Retention Ribbon
  Missouri Adjutant General's Twenty Ribbon
  Missouri Governor's Twelve Ribbon
  Missouri Basic Training Ribbon
  Governor's Unit Citation

Montana 
Montana National Guard State Awards:
  Montana Distinguished Service Medal
  Montana Commendation Medal
  Montana Air Medal
  Montana Distinguished Patriot Medal
  Montana Recruiting Ribbon
  Montana Campaign Ribbon
  Montana Noble Eagle Ribbon
  Montana Overseas Training Ribbon
  Montana Volunteer Campaign Ribbon
  Montana Service Ribbon
  Montana Attendance Ribbon
  Montana Physical Fitness Ribbon
  Montana Outstanding Unit

Nebraska 
Nebraska National Guard State Awards

  Nebraska Legion of Merit
  Nebraska Meritorious Service Medal
  Nebraska Commendation Medal
  Nebraska Outstanding Soldier Medal
  Nebraska Individual Achievement Medal
  Nebraska Recruiting Achievement Medal
  Nebraska Desert Shield/Storm Service Ribbon
  Nebraska Homeland Defense Service Ribbon
  Nebraska Emergency Service Medal
  Nebraska Service Medal
  Nebraska Military Funeral Honors Ribbon

Nevada 
Nevada National Guard State Awards:

  Nevada Medal of Valor
  Maj. Gen. Drennan A. Clark Order of Nevada
  Nevada Distinguished Service Medal
  Nevada Medal of Merit
  Nevada Commendation Medal
  Nevada Command Ribbon
  Nevada Outstanding Airman Ribbon
  Nevada Honor Guard Ribbon
  Nevada Resource Protection Team Ribbon
  Nevada Emergency/Humanitarian Service Ribbon
  Nevada Overseas Service Ribbon
  Nevada Meritorious Service Ribbon
  Nevada Service Medal
  Nevada First Sergeant's Ribbon
  Nevada Adjutant General's Outstanding Graduate Award
  Nevada State Safety Ribbon
  Nevada Recruiting Ribbon
  Nevada War on Terrorism Medal
  Nevada Governor's Outstanding Unit Award

New Hampshire 
  New Hampshire National Guard Medal of Honor
  New Hampshire National Guard Commendation Ribbon
  New Hampshire National Guard Distinguished Service Medal
  New Hampshire National Guard Soldier of the Year Ribbon (ARNG)
  New Hampshire National Guard Airman of the Year Ribbon (ANG)
  New Hampshire National Guard Honor Guard Ribbon
  New Hampshire National Guard State Active Service Ribbon
  New Hampshire National Guard Honorary Recruiting Ribbon
  New Hampshire National Guard Counterdrug Task Force Ribbon
  New Hampshire National Guard Service Bar

New Jersey 
New Jersey National Guard State Awards:

  New Jersey Distinguished Service Medal
  New Jersey Meritorious Service Medal
  New Jersey Valor Ribbon
  New Jersey Commendation Medal
  New Jersey Medal of Honor
  New Jersey Good Conduct Ribbon
  New Jersey Merit Award
  New Jersey Desert Storm Service Medal
  New Jersey Desert Storm Ribbon
  New Jersey State Service Award
  New Jersey Recruiting Award
  New Jersey Governor's Unit Award
  New Jersey Unit Strength Award

New Mexico 
New Mexico National Guard State Awards (in order of precedence from NM Statute 20-10):
 New Mexico Medal of Valor with palm
  New Mexico Medal of Valor
 Special MacArthur Service Medal
  New Mexico Distinguished Service Medal
  New Mexico Medal of Merit
 New Mexico Cold War Medal (New Mexico State Defense Force only)
 Outstanding Enlisted Leader of the Year Ribbon
  New Mexico Outstanding Service Medal
  New Mexico Outstanding Unit Citation
  New Mexico Emergency Service Military Ribbon
 Counter-drug service ribbon
 Community Service Ribbon
 Physical Fitness Ribbon
  New Mexico Long Service Medal and Service Ribbon
  New Mexico Good Conduct Medal
  New Mexico Perfect Attendance Ribbon
  New Mexico Academy Service Ribbon

New York 
New York state military awards:
  New York Medal of Valor
  New York Conspicuous Service Medal
  New York Meritorious Service Medal
  New York Military Commendation Medal
  New York Long and Faithful Service Medal
  New York Desert Storm Service Medal
  New York Defense of Liberty Medal
  New York Conspicuous Service Cross
  New York Medal for Merit
  New York Conspicuous Service Star
  New York Outstanding Airman/Soldier of the Year Ribbon
  New York Recruiting Medal
  New York Aid to Civil Authority Medal
  New York Counterdrug Service Ribbon
  New York Exercise Support Ribbon
  New York Humane Service to NYS Medal
  New York First Sergeant Ribbon (Army)
  New York First Sergeant Ribbon (Air)
  New York Military Support Medal, 1980 Winter Olympics
  New York Physical Fitness Ribbon

New York National Guard State Awards:

North Carolina 
North Carolina National Guard State Awards:

  North Carolina Distinguished Service Medal
  North Carolina Meritorious Service Medal
  North Carolina Commendation Medal
  North Carolina Achievement Medal
  North Carolina Adjutant General's Meritorious Achievement Service Ribbon
  North Carolina State Active Duty Ribbon
  North Carolina Service Ribbon
  North Carolina Governor's Unit Citation
  North Carolina Meritorious Unit Citation
  North Carolina Outstanding Unit Award

North Dakota 
North Dakota National Guard State Awards:

Air National Guard Awards:
  North Dakota Distinguished Service Medal
  North Dakota Legion of Merit
  North Dakota State Meritorious Service Ribbon
  North Dakota State Commendation Ribbon
  North Dakota State Achievement Ribbon
  North Dakota Emergency Service Ribbon
  North Dakota State Outstanding Unit Ribbon
  North Dakota OCONUS Ribbon 
  North Dakota Recruiting Ribbon 
  North Dakota 1st Sergeant Ribbon 
  North Dakota Service Ribbon
  North Dakota Basic Training Ribbon
Army National Guard Awards:
  North Dakota Distinguished Service Medal
  North Dakota Legion of Merit
  North Dakota State Meritorious Service Ribbon
  North Dakota State Commendation Ribbon
  North Dakota State Achievement Ribbon
  North Dakota Emergency Service Ribbon
  North Dakota Military Funeral Honors Ribbon
  North Dakota Strength Management Ribbon
  North Dakota Service Ribbon
  North Dakota Basic Training Ribbon
Worn on right side, after federal awards:
  North Dakota State Outstanding Unit Citation (Army)
Obsolete or no longer awarded:
  North Dakota National Emergency Service Ribbon (Berlin Crisis)
  North Dakota Selected Reserve Force Ribbon

Ohio 
Ohio National Guard State Awards:

  Ohio Cross Medal
  Ohio Distinguished Service Medal
  Ohio Commendation Medal
  Ohio Faithful Service Ribbon
  Ohio Special Service Ribbon
  Ohio Award of Merit Ribbon
  Ohio Basic Training Ribbon
  Ohio Recruiters Achievement Ribbon

Oklahoma 
Oklahoma National Guard State Awards:

  Oklahoma Distinguished Service Cross
  Oklahoma Star of Valor
  Oklahoma Distinguished Service Medal
  Oklahoma Meritorious Service Medal
  Oklahoma Commendation Medal
  Oklahoma Exceptional Service Medal
  Oklahoma Guardsman Medal
  Oklahoma Senior Enlisted Leadership Ribbon
  Oklahoma Desert Storm Service Medal
  Oklahoma Selective Reserve Medal
  Oklahoma Alfred P. Murrah Service Medal (Oklahoma Bombing)
  Oklahoma Recruiting Ribbon
  Oklahoma Active Duty Service Medal
  Oklahoma Long Service Ribbon 5 years
  Oklahoma Long Service Ribbon 10 years
  Oklahoma Long Service Ribbon 15 years
  Oklahoma Long Service Ribbon 20 years
  Oklahoma Long Service Ribbon 25 years
  Oklahoma Long Service Ribbon 30 years
  Oklahoma Long Service Ribbon 35 years
  Oklahoma Good Conduct Ribbon
  Oklahoma Governor's Distinguished Unit Award
  Oklahoma Commander's Trophy Award Ribbon

Oregon 

Oregon National Guard State Awards:

  Oregon Distinguished Service Medal
  Oregon Exceptional Service Medal
  Oregon Meritorious Service Medal
  Oregon Commendation Medal
  Oregon 30 Year Faithful Service Medal
  Oregon Emergency Service Ribbon
  Oregon Superior Soldier Ribbon
  Oregon Faithful Service Medal
  Oregon Recruiting Ribbon
  Oregon Superior Unit Ribbon

Pennsylvania 
Pennsylvania National Guard Commonwealth Awards:
  Pennsylvania Cross for Valor
  Pennsylvania Distinguished Service Medal
  Pennsylvania Guardsman Medal
  Pennsylvania Meritorious Service Medal
  Pennsylvania Commendation Medal
  Pennsylvania Service Ribbon
  Pennsylvania GEN William Moffat-Reilly Medal
  Pennsylvania Keystone Freedom Medal
  Pennsylvania 20 Year Medal
  Pennsylvania MG Thomas. R. White Medal
  Pennsylvania Recruiting and Retention Medal
  Pennsylvania GEN Thomas. J. Stewart Medal
  Pennsylvania Military Honors Program Service
  Pennsylvania Governor's Unit Citation Air Force Service
  Pennsylvania Governor's Unit Citation Army Service

Puerto Rico 
Puerto Rico National Guard Commonwealth Awards:
  Military Medal of Honor of the Legislative Assembly of Puerto Rico
  Puerto Rico Medal for Distinguished Service
  Puerto Rico Medal of Valor
  Puerto Rico Merit Cross
  Puerto Rico Wounded in Action Medal
  Order of the Governor of Puerto Rico Common Defense Service Medal
  Puerto Rico Combat Service Medal
  Puerto Rico Commendation Medal
  Puerto Rico Outstanding Soldier/NCO of the Year Ribbon
  Puerto Rico Service Medal
  Puerto Rico Exemplary Conduct Ribbon
  Puerto Rico War Service Ribbon
  Puerto Rico SG Merit Achievement Award
  Puerto Rico Disaster Relief Ribbon
  Puerto Rico Hurricane Georges Ribbon
  Puerto Rico Active Duty for Training Ribbon
  Puerto Rico Caribbean Emergency Ribbon
  Puerto Rico Civil Disturbance Ribbon
  Puerto Rico Law Enforcement Ribbon
  Puerto Rico VIII Pan-American Games Support Ribbon
  Puerto Rico English Language Proficiecy Ribbon
  Puerto Rico Counterdrug Service Ribbon
  Puerto Rico 1992 Regatta Ribbon
  Puerto Rico Community Service Ribbon

Rhode Island 
Rhode Island medals are prescribed in Title 30 of the Rhode Island Code.

  Rhode Island Cross
  Rhode Island Star
  Rhode Island Commendation Medal
  Rhode Island National Guard Defense Service Medal
  Rhode Island National Guard National Guard Service Medal
  Rhode Island National Guard Emergency State Ribbon
  Rhode Island Army National Guard Recruiting Ribbon 	
  Rhode Island Air National Guard Recruiting Ribbon
  Rhode Island Gubernatorial Unit Award

South Carolina 
South Carolina National Guard State Awards:

  South Carolina Palmetto Cross
  South Carolina Medal of Valor
  South Carolina Exceptional Service Medal
  South Carolina Extraordinary Achievement Medal
  South Carolina Meritorious Service Medal
  South Carolina Achievement Ribbon
  South Carolina State Service Ribbon
  South Carolina Retirement Medal
  South Carolina Palmetto Service Ribbon
  South Carolina National Guard Mobilization Support Award Ribbon
  South Carolina Cadet Medal of Merit Service Ribbon
  South Carolina Recruiting and Retention Achievement Medal
  South Carolina Safety Service Ribbon
  South Carolina Counter-Drug Ribbon
  South Carolina Governor's Unit Citation

South Dakota 
South Dakota National Guard State Awards:

  South Dakota Medal of Valor
  South Dakota Achievement Ribbon
  South Dakota Distinguished Service Award
  South Dakota Emergency Operations Ribbon
  South Dakota Recruiting Medal
  South Dakota Service Medal
  South Dakota Berlin Crisis Medal
  South Dakota Desert Storm Ribbon
  South Dakota Desert Storm Unit Citation
  South Dakota Unit Citation
  South Dakota Distinguished Unit Award

Tennessee 
Tennessee National Guard Awards:

  Tennessee Distinguished Service Medal
  Tennessee Ribbon for Valor
  Tennessee Distinguished Patriot Medal
  Tennessee Commendation Ribbon
  Tennessee Individual Achievement Ribbon
  Tennessee Recruiting Merit Ribbon
  Tennessee National Emergency Service Medal
  Tennessee War Service Ribbon
  Tennessee Counterdrug Service Ribbon
  Tennessee Service Ribbon
  Tennessee Volunteer Ribbon
  Tennessee Meritorious Unit Citation
  Tennessee Distinguished Unit Citation
  Tennessee Outstanding Unit Performance Commendation
  Tennessee Volunteer Recruiting and Retention Unit Citation

Texas 
Texas National Guard State Awards:

  Texas Legislative Medal of Honor
  Texas Medal of Valor
  Texas Purple Heart Medal
  Texas Superior Service Medal
  Texas Lone Star Distinguished Service Medal
  Texas Outstanding Service Medal
  Texas Medal of Merit (also awarded with "V" for valor)
   Texas Cold War Victory Medal
  Texas Adjutant General's Individual Award
  Texas Federal Service Medal
  Texas Desert Shield-Desert Storm Campaign Medal
  Texas Humanitarian Service Ribbon
   Texas Homeland Defense Service Medal
  Texas Combat Service Ribbon
  Texas Cavalry Service Medal
  Texas Faithful Service Medal
  Texas State Guard Association Service Ribbon
  Texas State Commanding General's Individual Award Ribbon
  Texas State Guard Enlisted Personnel Basic Training Ribbon
  Texas State Guard NCO Professional Development Service Ribbon
  Texas State Guard Officer Professional Development Service Ribbon
  Texas State Guard Meritorious Service Ribbon
  Texas State Guard Recruiting Service Ribbon
  Texas State Guard Physical Fitness Service Ribbon
  Texas State Guard Service Medal Ribbon
  Texas Governor's Unit Citation
  Texas Organizational Excellence Unit Award
  Texas State Guard Meritorious Unit Award

Utah 
Utah National Guard State Awards:

Reference Pictures available at https://web.archive.org/web/20061208051453/http://armyawards.com/arng/ut/utawards.shtml.
  Utah Medal of Valor
  Utah Cross
  Utah Medal of Merit
  Utah Commendation Medal
  Utah Deteur Digniory
  Utah 2002 Olympic Winter Games Service Ribbon
  Utah Emergency Service Ribbon
  Utah State Partnership Program Ribbon
  Utah Joint Staff Service Ribbon
  Utah Joint Commendation Service Ribbon
  Utah National Guard Patriot Service Ribbon
  Utah Recruiting Ribbon
  Utah Achievement Ribbon
  Utah Service Ribbon
  Utah Basic Training Ribbon
  Utah Military Funeral Service Ribbon

Vermont 
Vermont National Guard State Awards:

  Vermont Distinguished Service Medal (National Guard award)
  Vermont Medal of Merit
  Vermont Commendation Medal
  Vermont Meritorious Service Ribbon
  Vermont Outstanding Unit Award
  Vermont Organizational Excellence Award
  Vermont World War II Medal
  Vermont National Defense Medal
  Vermont Good Conduct Ribbon
  Vermont Desert Storm Ribbon
  Vermont Active Duty for Training Ribbon
  Vermont Professional Development Ribbon
  Vermont Career Service Award
  Vermont Service Ribbon
  Vermont Duty Ribbon
  Vermont State Special Duty Ribbon
  Vermont Military Humanitarian Service Medal

Related:
  Vermont Patriots Medal
  Vermont Distinguished Service Medal (Veterans award)
  Vermont Veterans Medal

Virgin Islands 
Virgin Islands National Guard Territory Awards

  Virgin Islands Distinguished Service Medal
  Virgin Islands Meritorious Service Medal
  Virgin Islands Commendation Medal
  Virgin Islands Long and Faithful Service Medal
  Virgin Islands Emergency Service Ribbon

Virginia 
Listed in order of precedence when worn or displayed:

  Virginia Distinguished Service Medal
  Virginia National Guard Legion of Merit
  Virginia National Guard Bronze Star Medal
  Virginia National Guard Commendation Medal
  Virginia Governor's National Service Medal
  Virginia National Guard 3-year Service Ribbon
  Virginia National Guard Homeland Defense Ribbon
  Virginia National Guard Emergency Service Ribbon
  Virginia National Guard Perfect Attendance Ribbon
  Virginia National Guard Strength Maintenance Ribbon
  Virginia National Guard Military Funeral Honors Ribbon

Washington 
Washington National Guard State Awards:

  Washington Distinguished Service Medal (WSDSM) - This decoration shall be awarded to any person who distinguishes himself/herself by exceptionally meritorious service as a member or in affiliation to the State of Washington in duty of great responsibility. The performance must be such as to merit recognition for service that is clearly exceptional and of a conspicuously higher degree than appropriate for award of the WSLM.
  Washington Legion of Merit Medal (WSLM) - This decoration shall be awarded to any person who has distinguished himself/herself in the performance of exceptionally meritorious service and/or outstanding achievements as member or in affiliation to the State of Washington. The performance must be such as to merit recognition for service that is clearly exceptional over an extended period of time or achievements conspicuously greater than those appropriate for lesser decorations. 
  Washington Cross of Valor (Discontinued as of 30 September 1998)
  Washington Aviation Cross Medal (Discontinued as of 30 September 1998)
  Washington Guardsman Medal (WSGM) - This decoration shall be awarded to any person who demonstrates extreme courage in the performance of a heroic act involving personal hazard or danger. This decoration may not be awarded solely on the basis of having saved a life.
  Washington Meritorious Service Medal (WSMSM) - This decoration shall be awarded to any person who has distinguished himself/herself by performing meritorious service and/or achievements, as a member or in affiliation with the Military Department, State of Washington. This decoration is awarded for service over an extended period of time or achievements conspicuously greater than those appropriate for award of the WSCM. This decoration is not appropriate for presentation as an impact award. 
  Washington Commendation Medal (WSCM) - This decoration shall be awarded to any person who distinguishes himself/herself by heroism, and/or extraordinary duty performance, as a member or in affiliation with the Military Department, State of Washington. This decoration is awarded for accomplishments of a lesser degree and shorter service duration than required for award of the WSMSM. This decoration is appropriate for presentation as an impact award.
  Washington Achievement Medal (WSAM) - This decoration shall be awarded to any person who distinguishes himself/herself by specific acts and/or achievements resulting in enhanced or increased unit readiness, operations, morale, or mission accomplishment, as a member or in affiliation with the Military Department, State of Washington. This decoration is awarded for accomplishments of a lesser degree and shorter service duration than required for the WSCM. The WSAM is appropriate for presentation as an impact award. 
  Washington Strength Management Ribbon (WSSMR) - Previously known as the Washington State Distinguished Recruiting Ribbon it was renamed 31 January 1999. This ribbon shall be awarded to anyone who recruits an individual or causes a Soldier to reenlist/extend (retention attributed to a specific Soldier) during a one-year period. Only one award will be given in any one-year period. Full-time recruiting force personnel and Soldiers on orders as recruiter aides are ineligible for this award.
  Washington State Defense Service Ribbon (WSDSR) (Discontinued - 31 December 1994; Reestablished 18 June 2002) - This ribbon shall be awarded to any Soldier of the Washington Army National Guard inducted into Active Federal Service (title 32 or 10) upon declaration of an emergency by the President of the United States or for special operations at any time between 7 December 1943 to 31 December 1994 and after 11 September 2001. 
  Washington Emergency Service Ribbon (WSESR) - Previously known as the Washington State Disaster Relief Ribbon from 3 May 1963 to 31 December 1994. This ribbon shall be awarded to any person ordered by the governor into state active duty or to any individual(s) providing support services during a declared state of emergency. An individual must work one day (minimum of eight hours) in order to be eligible to receive this award. 
  Washington National Guard Service Ribbon (WANGSR) - This ribbon is awarded to any Soldier of the Washington Army National Guard upon completion of five years of satisfactory service in any of the Armed Forces of the United States, or components thereof. The Soldier must be a member of the WAARNG when the ribbon is presented. Regardless of the number of years of service beyond five, the recipient will receive only one initial ribbon upon assignment to the WAARNG or WSG. Thereafter, the Soldier will receive subsequent awards at five year increments so long as they are otherwise entitled. The individual's pay entry base date (PEBD) will be used to determine year of service for this award. 
  Washington Good Conduct Medal (Discontinued as of 31 December 1994)
  Washington Unit Citation Ribbon (WSUCR) (Right Side) - This ribbon shall be awarded to each member of a Washington Army National Guard unit or Washington State Guard which is cited by TAG or a higher military headquarters for notable achievement, such as winning the Eisenhower Trophy, the Draper Armor Award, or the Superior Unit Award. Only one unit citation will be awarded to a unit during a single calendar year regardless of the number of notable achievements. Only those who were members of the unit during the period for which the citation was earned will wear the award. Soldiers who received the ribbon may continue to wear it when transferred. Individuals transferring into a cited unit who are not otherwise entitled, will not be authorized the ribbon. The Washington State Unit Citation will not be awarded in conjunction with the Army Superior Unit Award.

Washington Air National Guard Awards:

  Washington Air National Guard Aviation Cross
  Washington Air National Guard Aerial Achievement Medal
  Washington Air National Guard Distinguished Recruiting Award

West Virginia 
West Virginia National Guard State Awards:
  West Virginia Distinguished Service Medal (WVDSM)- Honors West Virginia National Guard members who carry out feats of heroism or provide sustained exceptional service.
  West Virginia Legion of Merit (WVLOM)- Honors West Virginia National Guard members who carry out exceptional service or execute a noteworthy feat of valor.
  West Virginia Meritorious Service Medal (WVMSM)- Honors West Virginia National Guard members who carry out outstanding service or feats of heroism of a lesser degree than would warrant the West Virginia National Guard Legion of Merit.
  West Virginia Commendation Medal (WVCM)- Honors West Virginia National Guard members who carry out meritorious service of a degree greater than that required for the West Virginia National Guard Achievement Medal but of a lesser degree than would warrant the West Virginia National Guard Distinguished Service Medal.
  West Virginia Achievement Medal (WVAM)- Honors West Virginia National Guard members who carry out meritorious service of a lesser degree than would warrant the West Virginia National Guard Commendation Medal.
  West Virginia Emergency Service Ribbon (WVESR)- Honors West Virginia National Guard members who carry out service honorably in the event of an emergency or other crisis as determined by the Governor.
  West Virginia State Service Ribbon (WVSSR)- Honors West Virginia National Guard members who satisfactorily carry out active duty service.
  West Virginia Service Ribbon (WVSR)- Honors West Virginia National Guard members who carry out five years of service honorably. Additional awards are authorized for every additional five years.
  West Virginia Minuteman Ribbon (WVMR)- Honors West Virginia National Guard members who is solely responsible for the enlistment of at least five individuals over a 180-day period. At least three of these individuals must be non-prior service.
  West Virginia Distinguished Unit Award- The West Virginia Distinguished Unit Award is awarded to units or organizations, not larger than squadron or battalion, which have distinguished themselves by outstanding achievement or meritorious service in support of military operations, or in support of the state or nation, not involving combat operations against an enemy.

Wisconsin 
Wisconsin National Guard State Awards:
  Wisconsin Meritorious Service Medal
  Wisconsin Meritorious Service Ribbon
  Wisconsin Department of Military Affairs Commendation Medal
  Wisconsin Distinguished Service Medal
  Wisconsin National Guard Recruiting Bar
  Wisconsin National Guard Service Ribbon
  Wisconsin National Guard Emergency Service Ribbon
  Wisconsin National Guard Write Medal
  Wisconsin National Guard Southwest Asia Service Ribbon
  Eisenhower Trophy Unit Citation
  Berlin Crisis Ribbon
  Wisconsin Wortham Achievement Service Ribbon

Wyoming 
Wyoming National Guard State Awards
  Wyoming National Guard Association Medal for Excellence
  Distinguished Service Medal
  Meritorious Achievement Medal
  Outstanding Service Ribbon
  Exceptional Achievement Ribbon
  Achievement Ribbon
  Berlin Crisis Ribbon
  Selected Reserve Force Ribbon
  Wyoming National Guard Service Ribbon
  State Active Duty Ribbon
  Wyoming National Guard Recruiting Ribbon
  Wyoming Active Duty Basic Training Ribbon
No longer authorized for wear
  Wyoming Air National Guard 5-year Service Medal
  Wyoming Air National Guard 10-year Service Medal
  Wyoming Philippine Campaign Medal

See also
 Awards and decorations of the state defense forces

References

Further reading

Borgmann, Fred J. (2013) Wisconsin Military And Civil Medals publisher Fred J. Borgmann, Iola, Wisconsin

External links 
State Medals - The OMSA Medal Database
Armyawards.com Army National Guard
Ultimate Rack
U.S. Decorations Ribbon Rackbuilder
Northwest Territorial Mint